Boyko Kamenov Simeonov (born 28 November 1975) is a Bulgarian former professional footballer and a professional football manager who currently manages Chernomorets Balchik.

Playing career
Kamenov played as a forward and attacking midfielder in a 14-year professional career. He began his career at Cherno More Varna. In his career Kamenov played for several clubs in Bulgaria, Malta, Maldives and Singapore. 

With New Radiant he won Maldivies President's Cup and Malé League in 2004 and Maldives FA Cup in 2005. Kamenov was part of the squad that reached the semi-finals of the 2005 AFC Cup, scoring two goals in eight games. 

In 2006, Kamenov signed with Singapore's S.League side Geylang United. He ended his career at the end of the 2008–09 season.

Coaching career
In January 2013, Kamenov was announced as the new head coach of Maldivian side Club Valencia.

On 12 November 2015, it was announced that Kamenov had joined Bulgarian top division club Botev Plovdiv as assistant head coach. He left Botev in August 2016, following Nikolay Kostov out of the club.

Honours

As a player
New Radiant
Maldivies President's Cup: 2004
Malé League: 2004
Maldives FA Cup: 2005

References

External links
Player Profile at 7msport.com
Profile at botevplovdiv.bg

1975 births
Living people
Bulgarian footballers
PFC Cherno More Varna players
PFC Spartak Varna players
PFC Marek Dupnitsa players
Floriana F.C. players
Geylang International FC players
First Professional Football League (Bulgaria) players
Singapore Premier League players
Bulgarian expatriate footballers
Expatriate footballers in Malta
Expatriate footballers in the Maldives
Expatriate footballers in Singapore
Bulgarian football managers
Sportspeople from Varna, Bulgaria
Association football forwards